is a former Japanese football player.

Club statistics

References

External links

1988 births
Living people
Association football people from Gifu Prefecture
Japanese footballers
J1 League players
Japan Football League players
Nagoya Grampus players
FC Ryukyu players
Association football forwards